Eleutherodactylus sciagraphus is a species of frog in the family Eleutherodactylidae. It is endemic to Haiti and only known from near its type locality at an elevation of  asl in the Massif de la Hotte. Its specific name refers to its heavily barred hindlimbs. Its common name is Sud robber frog.

Description
Males measure  and females  in snout–vent length. Dorsum is greenish to gray to unicolor dark brown. Venter is white or yellowish with dark gray to black markings in many individuals. Hindlimbs are banded with many primary bars and prominent shadow bars.

Habitat and conservation
This rare species was last recorded in 1984. Its natural habitat is closed moist forest where it occurs under rocks. It is threatened by habitat loss occurring in the area and not known from any protected area.

References

sciagraphus
Endemic fauna of Haiti
Amphibians of Haiti
Amphibians described in 1973
Taxonomy articles created by Polbot
Taxa named by Albert Schwartz (zoologist)